Countess Yekaterina Pavlovna Sheremeteva (born as Princess of Vyazma (княжна Вяземская)) was the founder of naturalistic museum in Podolsk uyezd, Moscow Governorate, and the founding member of the Ancient Literature Fanciers Society.

Ancestry

References

Russian nobility
1849 births
1929 deaths
Museum founders